Cardiff North is a constituency represented in the House of Commons of the UK Parliament since 2017 by Anna McMorrin of the Labour Party.

The seat has been relative to others a marginal seat since 2001 as well as a swing seat as its winner's majority has not exceeded 8% of the vote since the 14.3% majority won in that year. The seat has changed political allegiance twice since that year.

History
This seat is the residential quarter of Wales' capital, over half of northern Cardiff consists of owner-occupied housing, with a higher number of a middle class population than other sections. Historically it has mainly elected Conservative MPs, but with new housing development Welsh Labour has overturned the nominal majority more recently, turning the seat into a national target swing-constituency. By 2004, the Conservatives held a majority of councillors within the district (13, against five Liberal Democrats, three independents and no Labour), but in the following 2005 general election Welsh Labour's Julie Morgan retained the seat but with a reduced majority.

BBC News political editor Nick Robinson profiled the constituency as part of the BBC's build-up to the 2010 general election: saying:

Morgan stood again for Welsh Labour in 2010, whilst the Conservatives chose Jonathan Evans MEP, who had previously been the MP for Brecon and Radnor. Evans won by 194 votes.

In 2015, Labour attempted to take the seat back but new candidate, Craig Williams, took it with a majority of 2,137. Many had expected it to be very close run again.  Labour retook the seat in 2017 on a 6.1% swing, producing a majority of 4,174; this was the first time in the seat's history it had voted for a Labour candidate in an election they did not win and the first time it elected an MP who is not a member of the largest party in the House of Commons since October 1974. In 2019, the seat bucked the trend by swinging to Labour despite their heavy defeat nationally.

Boundaries

1950–1974: The County Borough of Cardiff wards of Cathays, Central, Gabalfa, Penylan, and Plasnewydd.

1974–1983: The County Borough of Cardiff wards of Cathays, Central, Penylan, and Plasnewydd.

1983–2010: The City of Cardiff wards of Gabalfa, Heath, Lisvane and St Mellons, Llandaff North, Llanishen, Rhiwbina, and Whitchurch and Tongwynlais.

2010–present: The Cardiff electoral divisions of Gabalfa, Heath, Lisvane, Llandaff North, Llanishen, Pontprennau and Old St Mellons, Rhiwbina, and Whitchurch and Tongwynlais.

Cardiff city centre was in this constituency from its creation in 1950 until 1983, since when it has been in Cardiff Central.

Members of Parliament

Elections

Elections in the 1950s

Elections in the 1960s

Elections in the 1970s

Elections in the 1980s

Elections in the 1990s

Elections in the 2000s

Elections in the 2010s

Of the 80 rejected ballots:
64 were either unmarked or it was uncertain who the vote was for.
14 voted for more than one candidate.
2 had writing or mark by which the voter could be identified.

Of the 98 rejected ballots:
77 were either unmarked or it was uncertain who the vote was for.
21 voted for more than one candidate.

Of the 111 rejected ballots:
86 were either unmarked or it was uncertain who the vote was for.
22 voted for more than one candidate.
3 had writing or mark by which the voter could be identified.

See also
 Cardiff North (Senedd constituency)
 List of parliamentary constituencies in South Glamorgan
 Opinion polling for the next United Kingdom general election in individual constituencies
 List of parliamentary constituencies in Wales

Notes

References

External links
nomis Constituency Profile for Cardiff North – presenting data from the ONS annual population survey and other official statistics.
Politics Resources (Election results from 1922 onwards)
Electoral Calculus (Election results from 1955 onwards)
2017 Election House Of Commons Library 2017 Election report
A Vision Of Britain Through Time (Constituency elector numbers)

Politics of Cardiff
Parliamentary constituencies in South Wales
Constituencies of the Parliament of the United Kingdom established in 1950